David Bowie owned an extensive private art collection which included paintings, sculpture and furniture. He started collecting art in the mid-1970s and continued through the end of his life. His collection included paintings that he himself painted.

Bowie as an art collector and supporter of art
Bowie reportedly began appreciating and collecting art in the mid 1970s, when he moved to Berlin to escape his cocaine addiction. Artist and writer Matthew Collings characterized the collection as "bohemian, romantic, expressive, emotional art". Bowie was described by an art advisor as "a true collector. His acquisitions were not commercially motivated; he cared about the art, not the market. His was a deeply personal, eclectic collection, reflecting his British roots and his real passion for art." He was frequently featured in ARTnews' "Top 200 collectors" lists. Bowie's collection of contemporary African Art, was described as "[demonstrating] an appreciation that goes far beyond the all-too-frequent exoticism and 'othering' of art from the continent." In 1995, Bowie pushed for an exhibition of South African art, and he wrote about the 1995 Johannesburg Biennale for the magazine Modern Painters. By 1998, Bowie was a board member of Modern Painters, and he participated in the Nat Tate art hoax.

Notable artists and works in the collection

Notable artists included in Bowie's collection included:

 Outsider Art from the Gugging Group
 Frank Auerbach - 1965 Head of Gerda Boehm (l.)
 Jean-Michel Basquiat - 1984 Air Power - Year unknown "A Bruit Secret"
 David Bomberg
 Achille Castiglioni and Pier Giacomo Castiglioni - 1960s Brionvega RR 126 radiogram
 Patrick Caulfield
 Marcel Duchamp
 Harold Gilman - A London Interior
 Romuald Hazoumè
 Erich Heckel
 Damien Hirst
 Ivon Hitchens
 Peter Howson
 Leon Kossoff
 Peter Lanyon
 Wyndham Lewis
 Memphis Milano
 Henry Moore
 Odd Nerdrum
 Winifred Nicholson
 Méret Oppenheim
 Francis Picabia
 Peter Paul Rubens
 Egon Schiele
 William Scott
 Ettore Sottsass
 Stanley Spencer
 Graham Sutherland
 Tintoretto - Altarpiece of Saint Catherine
 William Turnbull
 Euan Uglow
 John Virtue
 Jack Butler Yeats

Basquiat's Air Power, estimated at US $3.5 million to be the most expensive single piece of art in Bowie's collection, sold for $8.8 million in 2016. Tintoretto's altarpiece, which was one of Bowie's earliest art acquisitions back in 1987, was sold for £191,000.

Bowie himself was a painter and sculptor, and works by his own hand are part of his collection. This includes a series of self-portraits he painted in 1995, one of which he used as the cover to his album Outside. Bowie would also attend gallery openings, often with his wife Iman, such as in 1999 when visiting an opening with artist Damian Loeb.

2016 auction

Around 350 pieces of art from Bowie's collection were put up for auction in November 2016. None of Bowie's own art was part of the auction, and the proceeds from the sale went to Bowie's family. An estimate by Sotheby's auction house estimated the value of the collection for sale at around US $13 million. Prior to the auction, some of the pieces were shown in Los Angeles, New York and Hong Kong. The pieces up for auction represented about two-thirds of Bowie's entire art collection.

Bowie's family sold the collection because they "didn't have the space" to store it.

The auction exceeded expectations, and the entire collection was sold over two days for £32.9 million (app. $41.5 million), while the highest-selling item was Jean-Michel Basquiat’s graffiti-inspired painting Air Power, sold for £7.09 million. Exhibitions of the works in London alone attracted over 51,000 visitors, the highest attendance for any pre-sale exhibition in London. The auctions themselves were attended by 1,750 bidders, with over 1,000 more bidding online.

2021 auction
In the mid- to late-1990s, Bowie painted a series of paintings entitled "DHead", typically followed by a roman numeral. These paintings were often of friends, bandmates, and self-portraits. One such DHead was used as the album cover for his 1995 album 1. Outside. In June 2021, "DHead XLVI" was put up for auction by a Canadian company, and fetched a price of CA $108,120 (or roughly USD $87,800).

References

See also
David Bowie Is

Citations

 

Bowie
Art collection